The 2016 Hockey East Men's Ice Hockey Tournament was played between March 3 and March 19, 2016 at campus locations and at the TD Garden in Boston, Massachusetts. The Northeastern Huskies defeated the UMass Lowell River Hawks by a score of 3–2 to earn their 2nd Hockey East championship in school history and earn Hockey East's automatic bid into the 2016 NCAA Division I Men's Ice Hockey Tournament. Kevin Boyle was named tournament MVP.

The tournament was the 32nd in league history.

Format
The tournament will include all twelve teams in the conference. Seeds 1–4 earned a first-round bye, and seeds 5–12 played a best-of-three Opening Round played on campus locations. Winners advanced to play the 1–4 seeds in the best-of-three Quarterfinals on campus locations. Winners of those series played in a single-game Semifinal, and those winners faced off in a single-game Championship Final, both at the TD Garden.

Regular season standings
Note: GP = Games played; W = Wins; L = Losses; T = Ties; PTS = Points; GF = Goals For; GA = Goals Against

Bracket
Teams are reseeded after the Opening Round and Quarterfinals

Note: * denotes overtime period(s)

Results

Opening Round

(5) Boston University vs. (12) Massachusetts

(6) Northeastern vs. (11) Maine

(7) Merrimack vs. (10) New Hampshire

(8) Connecticut vs. (9) Vermont

Quarterfinals

(1) Boston College vs. (9) Vermont

(2) Providence vs. (7) Merrimack

(3) Notre Dame vs. (6) Northeastern

(4) Massachusetts–Lowell vs. (5) Boston University

Semifinals

(1) Boston College vs. (6) Northeastern

(2) Providence vs. (4) Massachusetts–Lowell

Championship

(4) Massachusetts–Lowell vs. (6) Northeastern

Tournament awards

All-Tournament Team
F Nolan Stevens (Northeastern)
F Zach Aston-Reese (Northeastern)
F C. J. Smith (Massachusetts–Lowell)
D Colton Saucerman (Northeastern)
D Dylan Zink (Massachusetts–Lowell)
G Kevin Boyle* (Massachusetts–Lowell)

* Tournament MVP(s)

References

External links
2015 Hockey East Men's Ice Hockey Tournament

Hockey East Men's Ice Hockey Tournament
Hockey East Men's Ice Hockey Tournament
Hockey East Men's Ice Hockey Tournament